Kukkiwon, also known as World Taekwondo Headquarters, and home of the World Taekwondo Academy, is where the official taekwondo governing organization was established by the South Korean government. It is supervised by the International Sports Division of the Ministry of Culture, Sports, and Tourism.

History

Kukkiwon is based at 635 Yeoksam-dong in the Gangnam-gu district of Seoul, South Korea. Construction of the main building commenced on 19 November 1971, and was completed on 30 November 1972, with the organization being officially named on 6 February 1973.

In May 1973, the Korea Taekwondo Association and Kukkiwon hosted the first World Taekwondo Championships, with 200 taekwondo competitors from 17 countries in attendance. Kukkiwon has had a permanent taekwondo demonstration team since September 1974.

Un Yong Kim was the first President of Kukkiwon, and resigned from the position on 15 November 2001. Woon Kyu Uhm of the Chung Do Kwan was elected President on 2 March 2004. The President in late 2005 was Yong Gye Um. On 10 December 2009, Seung Wan Lee of the Jidokwan was elected as Kukkiwon's next President.

In mid-2010, Won Sik Kang became the president; he was also the current president of Song Moo Kwan, Korea.  President Kang stepped down at the end of his term of office in early 2013. After him the interim president while awaiting an election was Grandmaster Kyu Sok Lee, who also serves as Secretary-General for the Asian Taekwondo Union. Kim Chung Gun later acted as the Chair-in-Office. The next president was Grandmaster Lee Kyu Hyung (9th dan) after being provisionally named by the Director of the organization’s board as of August 20, 2013; he resigned after a short period, claiming he was unable to perform the role to the best of his abilities due to political issues.

The current president is Grandmaster Lee Dong Sup, elected on January 28, 2021.

See also

 Korean martial arts
 Sport in South Korea

References

External links
 Kukkiwon official website 
 Kukkiwon official website 
 Ministry of Culture, Sports, and Tourism 
 Kukkiwon at Google Cultural Institute

Sports organizations established in 1972
Sports venues in Seoul
Gangnam District
Organizations based in Seoul
Taekwondo organizations
1972 establishments in South Korea